The General Administration of Sport is the government agency responsible for sports in mainland China. It is subordinate to the State Council of the People's Republic of China. It also administers the All-China Sports Federation and Chinese Olympic Committee.

The agency is currently led by minister Gou Zhongwen.

Functions
The administration is responsible for a number of areas. They are:

 Creating a national sports framework
 Providing development in the sports industry and promoting sports development in rural regions.
 Promote physical activity and exercise participation in schools, regional and local communities.
 Organizing athletic and national sports events
 Enforcement of drug use and anti-competitive measures
 Liaising and cooperating sports with Hong Kong, Macau and Chinese Taipei.
 Organizing international sport events in China
 Support and fund research into the development of sports
 Implementing regulation governing the sports industry, market and best practice

Major events
(Need Expanding)
June 2017, due to improper "re-accommodation" of the chief coach Guoliang Liu, 4 players and 2 coaches in Chinese National Table Tennis Team declared to leave the 2017 ITTF World Tour Chinese Open.

Administration
The agency is organised into the following departments.

 General Office
 Sport for All Department 
 Competition and Training Department 
 Finance Department 
 Policy and Regulation Department 
 Personnel Department
 External Affairs Department 
 Science and Education Department
 Press and Publicity Department
 Party Committee
 Supervisory Bureau 
 Bureau of Retired Cadres

List of directors
 Marshal He Long (1952–1967)
Cao Cheng (1968–1971)
Wang Meng (1971–1974)
Zhuang Zedong (1974–1977)
Wang Meng (1977–1981)
Li Menghua (1981–1988)
Wu Shaozu (1988–2000)
Yuan Weimin (2000–2004)
Liu Peng (2004–2016)
Gou Zhongwen (2016–present)

See also
 Chinese sportspeople
 China at the Olympics
 China at the Paralympics
 Sport in Hong Kong
 Culture of China
 National Games of China
 National Peasants' Games
 2008 Summer Olympics

References

External links
  

Government agencies of China
Sport in China
State Council of the People's Republic of China
Sports ministries